Alex Levac (Hebrew: אלכס ליבק, born 1944, Tel Aviv) is an Israeli photojournalist and street photographer. He was awarded the Israel Prize for photography in 2005.

Youth and studies 
Alex Levac was born in Tel Aviv in 1944. After graduating in philosophy and psychology from Tel Aviv University and in photography from the London College of Printing.

Career 
He began working as a freelance photographer in Brazil from 1971 to 1974. In 1974–79, he worked in London and later in Los Angeles (1979–81). In 1981, he returned to Israel and settled in Jerusalem. Levac is married to Maariv journalist Sherry Ansky and they have one child.

In 1983, he became staff photographer for the daily Hadashot and since 1993 he is staff photographer for the Israeli daily Haaretz. In 1984, a photograph he took during the hijacking of a Tel Aviv bus disproved the official account of events and led to a long running scandal known as the Kav 300 affair. Levac has participated in a number of exhibitions, among them Amazon Indians, held at the University of California, Berkeley; the Ein Harod Israeli Biennale of Photography; and the Israel Museum in Jerusalem. He published five books.

Awards 
 In 1993, Levac received the Rita Poretzky Award of Photography from the Tel Aviv Museum of Art.
 In 2001, the Israeli Foreign Ministry chose Levac to represent Israel in the international exhibit "Our Country".
 In 2005, he won the Israel Prize, for photography. The judges who chose to award the prize emphasized the humanitarian perspective of his work. "No other photographer is as involved as Alex Levac in the Israeli experience," they wrote.

Quotes 
"I don't take a lot of pictures. I see things as though through a sieve. The choice of a specific moment is mine. I enjoy photography. It forces me to look at marginal things as well. There are wonderful situations where the photographic potential is enormous, and pictures truly leap to the eye, but most pictures are obtained by hard and patient work. I would like all my pictures to be great, full of historical, social, and anthropological meaning, but very few reach that level. Many times the result is simply anecdotal, visual amusements, the justaposition of bits of reality that usually are not connected to one another. Some are complex, others are simple, but they always tell something about us."

Published works 
Eye to Zion, edited by David Tartakover, published by Am Oved, 1994.
Tel Aviv Serenade, with poems by Nathan Alterman, Hakibbutz Hameuchad, 2000.
Our country, Introduction: Daniel Ben-Simon, published by the Ministry of Defense, 2000.
Like a dog, edited by David Tartakover, Keter Publishing, 2005.
Israel: the twenty-first century, Carmel Press, 2008.

Exhibitions 
2018: Oh Jerusalem, Gallery Bernd A. Lausberg, 16 February – 9 March 2018
2018: Lost in Translation, Haifa Museum, 4 August 2018 – 17 February 2019
2018: Israeli Street Moments, Leica Gallery Prague, 2 November 2018 – 6 January 2019

See also 
List of Israel Prize recipients

References

External links 
 A collection of Alex Levac's photographs
 Israel, With a Knowing Wink – An article about Levac in NYT's photography blog
 Israel Prize Official Site – CV of Alex Levac (in Hebrew)
Alex Levac Collections on the Digital collections of Younes and Soraya Nazarian Library, University of Haifa

Israeli Jews
Israel Prize in photography recipients
Israeli photojournalists
Israeli photographers
1944 births
Living people
Tel Aviv University alumni
People from Tel Aviv
Street photographers